Richèl Hogenkamp (born 16 April 1992) is a Dutch professional tennis player. Her highest WTA singles ranking is 94, which she reached on 24 July 2017. On the ITF Circuit, she has won 16 singles and 14 doubles titles.

Personal background

Hogenkamp was born on 16 April 1992 to Benno and Jolanda in Doetinchem, where she continues to reside. She has a younger sister who rides horses professionally. Hogenkamp's grandparents introduced her to tennis. Hogenkamp is currently coached by Kees Oostrom. She is in a relationship with Dutch footballer .

Career highlights
The biggest win of her career came at the 2012 Gastein Ladies where she beat top-seeded Julia Görges. In a 2016 Fed Cup World Group tie, she defeated Svetlana Kuznetsova. The match lasted exactly four hours, the longest match in the history of Fed Cup.

Grand Slam singles performance timeline

ITF Circuit finals

Singles: 26 (16 titles, 10 runner–ups)

Doubles: 22 (14 titles, 8 runner–ups)

References

External links

 
 
 

1992 births
Living people
Dutch female tennis players
People from Doetinchem
Sportspeople from Gelderland
Dutch LGBT sportspeople
LGBT tennis players
Lesbian sportswomen
20th-century Dutch women
21st-century Dutch women